The Keep is a 1983 supernatural horror film written and directed by Michael Mann and starring Scott Glenn, Gabriel Byrne, Jürgen Prochnow, Alberta Watson, and Ian McKellen. Set in Romania during World War II, it follows a group of Nazi soldiers who unleash a malevolent supernatural force after setting up camp in an ancient stone fortress in the Carpathian Mountains. It is an adaptation of the 1981 novel of the same title by American writer F. Paul Wilson. The musical score was composed by Tangerine Dream.

Filmed in Wales and at Shepperton Studios during the autumn of 1982, The Keep suffered numerous post-production issues, mainly the death of special effects supervisor Wally Veevers, who died before completing his work on the film. The film was also subject to significant editing troubles, as Mann's original director's cut ran 210 minutes in length, which its distributor, Paramount Pictures, mandated be cut to 120 minutes. After test screenings of the 120-minute version received unfavorable audience responses, the film was further truncated to its final 96-minute cut, which was released theatrically in December 1983.

Upon release, The Keep received mixed reviews from film critics, with many criticizing it for its intangible narrative, though it received some praise for its visual elements, while it performed poorly at the U.S. box office. Despite this, the film has gone on to develop a cult following in the years since its release. Though it received home media release on video, the film went unreleased on DVD until 2020, when the Australian media company Via Vision released a remastered DVD edition.

Some fans have petitioned for a release of Mann's original director's cut, which as of 2023, has never been made available.

Plot
In 1941 in Romania, following the commencement of Operation Barbarossa, a motorized Gebirgsjäger unit of the Wehrmacht, under the command of Captain Klaus Woermann, arrives to an uninhabited citadel – simply known as 'the Keep' – with the aim of taking control of the Dinu Pass in the Carpathian Mountains. Two soldiers, privates Lutz and Anton, attempt to loot a metallic icon within the keep but accidentally unleash a spectral entity which kills them. The being, known as Radu Molasar, proceeds to kill five more soldiers in the following days and begins to take corporeal form. A detachment of SS Einsatzkommandos, under the command of sadistic SD Sturmbannführer Erich Kaempffer, arrives to deal with what is thought to be Soviet partisan activity in a nearby village. He executes three civilians as collective punishment and taking another five as hostages, despite Woermann's protests.

At the instigation of the local village priest, Father Mihail Fonescu, the Germans retrieve an ailing Jewish historian, Theodore Cuza, from a concentration camp. Cuza deciphers a mysterious message written in Old Slavonic using the Glagolitic alphabet emblazoned on a wall of the citadel. Molasar saves the professor's daughter, Eva, from sexual assault by two Einsatzkommandos and cures Cuza of his debilitating scleroderma by touch. Cuza becomes indebted to the entity, who demands that Cuza remove a talisman from the keep so that Molasar can escape its confines.

Having remotely sensed Molasar's presence, a mysterious stranger named Glaeken Trismegestus arrives from Axis-occupied Greece, seducing Eva and incurring Cuza's ire. The malign power of Molasar begins to affect the villagers, seemingly driving them mad. A group of soldiers fire on Glaeken and force him into a ravine, but he is shown to still be alive. Kaempffer and Woermann clash over the former's sadistic crimes; Woermann furiously denounces the Nazis, claiming that the monster hunting them is a reflection of their evil. When their conversation is suddenly interrupted by the sound of horrible screams and machine gun fire coming from the keep's inner courtyard, Woermman is shot and killed by Kaempffer. Afterwards, Kaempffer goes to the now-silent courtyard, only to find that the entire garrison of the citadel has been slaughtered by Molasar, and that all the military vehicles parked inside have been disabled.

Stumbling across the carnage of the courtyard, a terrified Kaempffer is killed when he is confronted by Molasar as Cuza goes to remove the talisman from the keep. When Eva attempts to prevent him from doing so, Cuza refuses Molasar's command to kill her. In response, Molasar returns Cuza to his diseased state. Glaeken arrives, retrieves the talisman and confronts Molasar. After their battle, the latter is weakened and banished back into the innermost recesses of the keep. Glaeken is transformed in a storm of light and seals the aperture that freed Molasar, containing the entity within once more. The villagers, freed from Molasar's influence, escort Eva and Cuza away.

Cast

Themes
Writer Steven Rybin notes in his book Michael Mann: Crime Auteur that The Keep "does not construct a view of the world in which simple and unambiguous forces such as "good" and "evil" do battle. Mann clearly finds human evil in the failure of systems and not in individuals", citing the fact that the Nazi soldiers in the film pillage the metal crosses from the stone fortress for economic gain, unwittingly unleashing the evil spirit of Molasar. Rybin also asserts that, despite the narrative's core thematic elements, Mann is more concerned with crafting a "visual and sonic fairytale".

Production

Filming
Principal photography began in September 1982 in Wales, with an original shooting schedule of 13 weeks. Filming was grueling, and once principal photography was finished, additional re-shoots were done which extended the filming for a total of 22 weeks.

The sets for the Romanian village were built at the disused Glyn Rhonwy quarry, a former slate quarry near Llanberis in North Wales. Some interiors of the keep utilised the stonework within the Llechwedd Slate Caverns, near Blaenau Ffestiniog. Due to heavy rain, the film suffered significant delays in its shooting schedule. Shepperton Studios near London was used for interior Keep scenes featuring the demon Molasar. A secondary crew also went to Spain for footage depicting Greece.

English historian and film costume designer Andrew Mollo, brother of John Mollo of Star Wars fame, worked as an historical consultant for the German military costumes. In spite of the fact that war time Waffen-SS members typically wore grey or field green uniforms, according to Mollo, Michael Mann was insistent that they wear their iconic black uniforms, as to let the audience know that Byrne's character and his men were Nazi fanatics.

Special effects
The appearance of the film's malevolent villain, Molasar, was changed several times during filming because Michael Mann was unsure of how he wanted him to appear. Initially, Molasar was envisioned by Mann as an intangible entity whose appearance would be influenced purely by his surroundings. However, this description as it appeared in Mann's screenplay proved difficult for the special effects team to create. Mann ultimately settled on the entity initially appearing as an amorphous ball of energy which begins to take human shape with each appearance as the film progresses, morphing from a bundle of energy resembling a human nervous system, to a skeletal and then muscular form, and ultimately, a "statuesque Golem-like" body in the film's climax. A mechanical version of Molasar, which was designed early on during production, ultimately went unused due to Mann's shifting ideas about the monster's appearance, and instead the creature was portrayed by an actor in a bodysuit in its later humanoid stages.

The film's special effects were designed by Nick Maley, along with Nick Allder, who had previously worked on Alien and The Empire Strikes Back. Molasar was conceived by Enki Bilal.

Post-production troubles
Two weeks into post-production, visual effects supervisor Wally Veevers died, which caused enormous problems because nobody knew how he planned to finish the visual effects scenes in the movie, especially the ones that were planned for the original ending. According to Mann, he had to finish 260 shots of special effects himself after Veever's death.

The original climax that Mann envisioned involved Glaeken and Molasar in an epic effects-laden battle on top of the keep tower, ending with Glaeken opening an energy portal that blasts forth from the ground of the keep. The two were to fall from the keep wall and get sucked into the portal and tumble through a void. After that, Glaeken would materialize in the cavern below the keep by a pool and be reawakened as a mortal man.

With the production extensions and the film already having gone well over budget, Paramount refused to pay for the filming of the additional footage needed for this finale, necessitating that Mann instead opt for the simplified conclusion present in the film's theatrical cut.

Original director's cut
Mann's original cut of The Keep ran 210 minutes (three and a half hours) in length, but was truncated at the demand of Paramount Pictures to approximately 120 minutes (two hours). Test screenings of the two-hour cut were not favorable so Paramount further cut the film down to 96 minutes, against Mann's wishes. These last-minute cuts resulted in many plot holes, continuity mistakes, very obvious "jumps" in soundtrack and scenes, and bad editing issues. Even the sound mixing of the movie could not be finished properly because of Paramount's interference which is why every version of the movie suffers from bad sound design. The original 3 June 1983 release date was pushed back to 16 December due to the many problems in post-production.

The original happier ending, which had Eva finding Glaeken inside the keep after he defeated Molasar and Eva and her father leaving Romania by boat with Glaeken, was completely cut out by Paramount in order for the movie to have a shorter running time. Removal of these scenes caused confusion because numerous stills of this ending were shown in many movie magazines when a movie was to be released and even cast and crew members, including Mann, said in interviews that the movie had a happy ending. Part of the "happy" ending, in which Eva goes into the keep and finds Glaeken, was used in 1980s TV versions of the film. Other deleted scenes include more backstory between Glaeken and Molasar, actual explanation for why Eva and Glaeken fall in love, Glaeken killing the captain of the boat (the one who brings him into Romania) who tries to steal his "weapon" which he uses in the end to kill Molasar, more scenes between villagers and with Father Mihail and Alexandru, and Alexandru being killed by his sons when the keep starts to corrupt the village.

Contrary to some rumors, there actually was going to be a scene near the ending showing Molasar killing all the German soldiers inside the keep. Much of the effects for this scene including shots of soldiers heads exploding were filmed but this scene, which would include a lot more complicated effects, were unable to be finished after Veever's death.

Music 

The theme and incidental music for The Keep was composed by Tangerine Dream. The band previously worked with Mann on his first theatrical film Thief (1981). The score to The Keep is primarily made up of moody soundscapes, as opposed to straightforward music cues. Most notably, an ambient cover of Howard Blake's "Walking in the Air" was featured during the end sequence of the film. Additionally, Tangerine Dream's arrangement of the song "Gloria" from Mass for Four Voices by Thomas Tallis can also be heard in the film.

The musical score was released in several different bootleg editions in the years since the film's release.

In 2020, all the music that Tangerine Dream recorded for the 1984 album was officially released in full on the box set compilation Pilots of Purple Twilight (The Virgin Recordings 1980–1983). In July 2021, the score for The Keep was released on a standalone vinyl for Record Store Day by Universal Music Group's Canadian branch. It was subsequently made available for digital download by Universal Music Group on 30 October 2020.

Release

Marketing
Paramount released a theatrical trailer and television spots in promotion of the film, which include various footage from the extended versions of the film that do not appear in the final cut: Among them are a longer conversation between Woermann and Alexandru in which Woermann says that the keep looks like it was built to keep something in; a longer version of the scene where Molasar is talking with professor Cuza for the first time (also in this scene Cuza asks Molasar "What are you?" one more time); Glaeken talking with Eva asking her if she found what she was looking for and if she expected to find him; Glaeken touching Eva's face while she asks "What's happening to me?"; Glaeken walking inside the keep with his eyes turning white; longer version of the ending where Glaeken is standing at the entrance of the keep looking over Molasar's fog/white smoke; different version of the scene (different visual effects) where Glaeken is walking towards the room where Molasar is waiting for him (in this alternate scene Glaeken's sword is covered with some glowing grey light).

Box office
The film was give a limited theatrical release in the United States by Paramount Pictures on 16 December 1983 on 508 screens. It earned $1,032,295 during its opening weekend, premiering at number 13 in the national box office, and remained in release until 6 January 1984. It ultimately grossed $4,218,594 during its U.S. theatrical run, and was regarded as a box-office flop.

Critical response

Contemporaneous
Gene Siskel, film reviewer for the Chicago Tribune, rated The Keep two out of four stars, complaining that the Tangerine Dream soundtrack tended to overwhelm the dialogue. Siskel wrote, "Stay away from The Keep, one of the most inaudible movies ever made. Oh, sure, you can look at the pictures, but without the dialogue it's going to be most difficult to figure what's going on". Catharine Rambau of the Detroit Free Press also criticized the film, writing: "Michael Mann's gothic horror movie The Keep is a letdown, an unfortunate hybrid mutation of disco horror, rock video, high fashion and imitation art", adding that even its competent special effects and musical score "don't help much".

The Salem, Oregon Statesman Journals Ron Cowan noted that the film's "murky storytelling" is offset by "some arresting moments", but felt that the film's gore was at times visually excessive. Patrick Taggart of the Austin American-Statesman deemed it "one of the worst films of the year—artily photographed and with nothing to say".

Writing for the Sydney Morning Herald, film reviewer Susie Eisenhuth alternately praised the film, calling it "visually spectacular" and "mesmerising from the opening moments". "The Keep is the sort of movie I expect to see in one of the big cinema centres, being fed to the masses raised on Spielberg and spectacle", Eisenhuth wrote in her review.

Retrospective 
Although a financial and critical failure at the time of its release, The Keep gained a strong fan following and is considered by some to be a cult classic. , the film holds a 44% approval rating on the internet review aggregator Rotten Tomatoes from 16 reviews.

Michael Nordine of the LA Weekly wrote in a 2013 review that The Keep "can’t always keep its many moving parts in lockstep, what with its hinted-at mythos that obscures more than it elucidates and its cast of enigmatic characters whose precise dealings with one another are never made entirely clear". However Nordine praised Mann's direction, saying it showed "Mann's ... rare ability to elevate ostensibly schlocky material into something dark and majestic".

It has been mentioned that Michael Mann disowned the movie but in a 2009 interview he said that the production design and the form of the film were in better shape than the content, which is why he likes it for those aspects.

On 12 February 2016 at BAM, an Internet fan question asked whether Mann had plans to re-release his 1983 sci-fi horror film. Mann's answer: "No ... we were never able to figure out how we were to combine all these components that were shot (pre blue and green screen). That one’s going to stay in its ..." at which point Mann trailed off.

Home media 
Paramount Home Entertainment released The Keep on VHS in 1984, and later on LaserDisc on 22 December 1993.

Although the film has been made available for purchase and/or streaming on YouTube, Amazon Video, Apple TV, and Netflix (UK and Ireland), it went unreleased in physical disc format (aside from LaserDisc) in any country until the Australian label Via Vision Entertainment released an official remastered DVD edition on 20 January 2020. This Australian DVD release is in 2.35:1 aspect ratio and includes the original trailer as a special feature.

Related works 
A board game based on the film was designed by James D. Griffin and published by Mayfair Games. Under their Role Aids label, Mayfair Games also produced the role-playing game adventure The Keep based on the film.

In 2006, IDW Publishing published a 5-issue limited comic book series of the original novel written by American author F. Paul Wilson and drawn by Matthew Dow Smith.  The collected series included a foreword where F. Paul Wilson answers the question of exactly why he scripted a graphic novel version: "Because I consider this visual presentation of THE KEEP my version of the movie, what could have been...what should have been."

See also
The Keep (Mayfair Games)

References

Sources

External links
 
 
 
 
 The Keep German military vehicles

1983 films
1983 horror films
1980s supernatural horror films
1980s war films
American supernatural horror films
American World War II films
British supernatural horror films
British World War II films
Dark fantasy films
Demons in film
Eastern Front of World War II films
Films about Nazis
Films based on American novels
Films based on horror novels
Films directed by Michael Mann
Films scored by Tangerine Dream
Films set in 1941
Films set in castles
Films set in Romania
Films shot at Shepperton Studios
Films shot in Wales
Films with screenplays by Michael Mann
Horror war films
Paramount Pictures films
Supernatural war films
1980s English-language films
1980s American films
1980s British films

ja:ザ・キープ#映画